Propsocus is a genus of damp barklice in the family Elipsocidae. There are at least three described species in Propsocus.

Species
These three species belong to the genus Propsocus:
 Propsocus frodshami Schmidt & New, 2008
 Propsocus pallipes McLachlan, 1866
 Propsocus pulchripennis (Perkins, 1899)

References

Elipsocidae
Articles created by Qbugbot